Ghostly Swim 2 is a free digital download album released digitally in late 2014 by Adult Swim and Ghostly International (through Williams Street Records) and a CD version was released by Ghostly in April 2015. The track listing contains songs arranged and recorded in varying avant-garde styles of genres including ambient, house and techno. The album is a sequel to the two labels' previous collaborative album in 2008, Ghostly Swim.

Track listing
Pascäal – "Holo" (3:51)
Shigeto – "Tide Pools" (3:07)
Anenon – "Grapevine" (4:21)
Heathered Pearls – "Supra" (2:26)
Babe Rainbow – "Don't Tell Me I'm Wrong"
Dauwd – "Kolido" (6:51)
Patricia – "Spotting" (5:28)
Lord RAJA – "Spilt Out In Cursive" (2:04)
CFCF – "Oil" (6:15)
Feral – "Mirror" (3:42)
Mary Lattimore and Jeff Zeigler – "I Only Have Eyes For You" (5:04)
AceMo – "Futurism" (3:31)
Nautiluss – "Lonely Planet" (6:46)
Galcher Lustwerk - "In The Place" (CD bonus track)

References

Albums free for download by copyright owner
Adult Swim albums
Williams Street Records compilation albums